The KSAFA Major League is a third-division football league in Jamaica.  The twelve teams that compete in the league are based in the parishes of St. Andrew and Kingston.  At the end of each season, the top two teams are promoted to the KSAFA Super League. The bottom two teams are relegated to the KSAFA Syd Bartlett League.

Member teams 2008–2009
Barbican F.C.
Brown's Town F.C.
Central Kingston F.C.
Cooreville Gardens F.C.
Meadforest F.C.
Molynes United F.C.
Olympic Gardens F.C.
Port Royal F.C.
Rae Town F.C.
Rockfort F.C.
Seaview Gardens F.C.
Swallowfield F.C.

References

3